Niels Lie (unknown — unknown), was a Danish chess player, Danish Chess Championship silver medalist (1928).

Biography
From 1923 to 1949 Niels Lie participated regularly in the Danish Chess Championships, where he achieved his best result in 1928, when he ranked in 2nd place.

Niels Lie played for Denmark in the Chess Olympiad:
 In 1931, at fourth board in the 4th Chess Olympiad in Prague (+0, =7, -9).

References

External links

Niels Lie chess games at 365chess.com

Year of birth missing
Year of death missing
Danish chess players
Chess Olympiad competitors